Lair may refer to:

 Secret lair
 Lair, Kentucky
 Lair (novel), a 1979 novel by James Herbert
 Lair (video game), a 2007 video game
 The Lair, 2007-2008 American gay-themed vampire television series
 The Lair (Dreamworld), an exotic animal exhibit at the Dreamworld theme park on the Gold Coast, Australia

People with the surname
 James William Lair (1924–2014), American intelligence officer
 Mark Lair (born 1947), American bridge player
 Mike Lair (1946–2017), American politician
 Patrice Lair (born 1961), French football coach

Characters
 Irma Lair, a fictional character in the comic book W.I.T.C.H. and animated series of the same name

See also
 
 
 Den (disambiguation)
 Lare (disambiguation)
 Laer
 Liar (disambiguation)